"Top Back" is a song by American hip hop recording artist T.I., taken from his fourth studio album King (2006). The song, produced by Mannie Fresh, was released December 12, 2006.

Remix
The remix features fellow American rappers Young Jeezy, Young Dro, Big Kuntry King and B.G. T.I. performed the remix at the BET Hip Hop Awards on November 15, 2006.

The song was also remixed in 2007, by American rapper Lil Wayne, freestyling over the song's beat for his mixtape Da Drought 3. The freestyle was titled "Seat Down Low".

Other versions
"Top Back" (Amended Mix)
"Top Back" (Remix Instrumental)
"Top Back" (Explicit Mix Version)

Charts

Weekly charts

Year-end charts

Certifications

References

2006 singles
T.I. songs
B.G. (rapper) songs
Young Dro songs
Jeezy songs
Grand Hustle Records singles
Atlantic Records singles
Song recordings produced by Mannie Fresh
Songs written by T.I.
Songs written by Jeezy
Songs written by Mannie Fresh
2006 songs
Songs about cars